Asian Aviation Centre (AAC) is a private aerospace engineering and flying training academy in Sri Lanka.

Lionair was the parent company of AAC, which has now ceased to operate.

History 
The mastermind of the Asian Aviation Centre is veteran film producer and art lover Chandran Rutnam who dreamt of conquering the aviation field.

Chandran Rutnam stated, "I was the sort of guy who would go to an airport and watch the planes taking off. I remember as a kid, I went to the Colombo port and watched the ships coming and going out. I do not know whether it was wanderlust or freedom of movement. I do not know which one it was. Some years ago a friend of mine and I decided that we should have an airline."

He further stated how his fascination with aircraft started, "with hiring helicopters from Air Force to do a film on Vietnam. I was absolutely fascinated by these helicopters."

It is this fascination that led not only to the birth of one of the successful domestic airlines, the Lion Air, but also the Asian Aviation Centre (AAC), the premier Aerospace Engineering and Flying Training Academy in Sri Lanka. AAC is one of the few privileged Aerospace Academies in the world with an Airline to have a hands on practice for students.

In the hope of realizing his cherished dream, Rutnam explored the possibility of procuring helicopters with a like minded friend and found out that it was beyond their means. So, the idea was put on back burner for some time. However, Rutnam did not completely give up the idea. With a tip off on those two Russian built helicopters in Maldives, enthusiastic Rutnam moved into action and bought the two helicopters with the intention of starting a scheduled helicopter service.

As Chandran Rutnam realized that it was not commercially viable to start a helicopter service with two helicopters, he shelved off the idea but decided to go for fixed wing aircraft, thus laying the foundation for the domestic airline Lion Air. With aircraft bought from Kazakhstan, Lion Air commenced its operation in 1994.

However, in 1998, flying was banned following the shooting down of an aircraft belonging to Lion Air over the northern skies and Rutnam was faced with the tight spot of looking after a large number of employees. Since flying was banned, Rutnam decided to set up a flying school with the resources at hand.

With the assistance of Air Vice Marshal Upali Wanasinghe, who was formerly the Commandant of Kotalawala Defence Academy, Wing Commander Bandula Tennakoon, Commodore Ananda Samarakoon and former Air Vice Marshal Paddy Mendis, Rutnam started the school. The school started as an Engineering College.

"It always occurred while I was having meals, occasionally, the captain would come out of the cockpit and say that I graduated from your school. It was a satisfying feeling, that students are finding in this place. So it was one of the most rewarding enterprises that I have been involved in, educating the youth of this country," said Chandran Ratnam with a sense of justifiable elation.

At a time, when Lion Air was operating from Ratmalana within a limited space, Chandran Rutnam noticed a lovely and spacious hangar with two helicopters in Ratmalana. Soon Rutnam found out that the company was for sale and Rutnam bought the company.

The flight school which had been established in 1985, was incorporated into the Engineering College, marking the birth of Asian Aviation Centre (AAC).

Academic courses 

The AAC covers almost all the aspects of Aeronautical Engineering from re-building aircraft to the intricate mechanisms of aircraft. The AAC also offers a host of recreation facilities for students including a tennis court and aero-club. Heterogeneous students' population consists of local and foreign students.

The AAC offers a host of courses including Aircraft Maintenance Engineering(started in 1997), a degree programme in Aerospace Engineering affiliated to Kingston University with two years study in Sri Lanka and a further one-year study in UK to complete the degree.

The Flight Training School of AAC offers private pilot license, commercial pilot license and ATPL Ground Training, a pre-requisite to join Sri Lankan Airline and Local Aircraft Maintenance Engineering License which is approved by the Director General of Civil Aviation.

Aerospace for All

Asian Aviation Centre recently started a unique program called "Aerospace for All" program to facilitate those who are interested in aviation. The launching event was felicitated by Dr. Peter Barrington, Associate Dean, Faculty of Engineering/Field Leader, Aerospace Engineering at Kingston University. The event was held at the largest hangar complex of the Asian Aviation Centre at Colombo Airport, Ratmalana.

The program will be conducted in English for three months on the subjects related to aviation industry, satellites, space vehicles and space travel, rockets, helicopters, aircraft and hovercraft. Students who have completed their O/Ls and A/Ls are eligible for this program and on their completion of the course they will become familiar with the latest trend and the opportunities around, in the aviation industry.

References

External links 
 Official website
 Sri Lanka aviation industry targets young people
 Asian Aviation Centre launches aerospace program for all

Aviation licenses and certifications
Aviation schools
Companies of Sri Lanka
Training companies